The Palazzo Felicini is a Renaissance style palace in Via Riva di Reno 79 in central Bologna, Italy.

Like many of the palaces in the crowded center of Bologna, the piano nobile and facade extends up to the street over an arcaded front. It stands across from the Palazzo Bonasoni. While Aristotele Fioravanti may have performed some work on the palace before departing in the 1470s, the palace, as we see it today, was built in 1497, for a Bartolomeo Felicini, senator, and member of a prominent banking family. With the defeat of the Giulio II Bentivoglio by the papal forces, a member of the Felicini family was present to the city senate till 1584. The exterior has terracotta decorations. The interiors are frescoed by Angelo Michele Colonna and Giacomo Alboresi (Assumption of the Virgin, Family Chapel); Domenico Santi and Domenico Maria Canuti (Allegory of Aurora, Triumph of Bacchus and Ariadne, and Dusk in the piano nobile, 1664); and Death of Phaeton also by Alboresi and Colonna. The palace was sold to the Cardinal Pucci and then the Fibbia family (now also called Palazzo Felicini Fibbia or Felicini poi Fibbia). The palace underwent extensive restorations in 1905.

Sources
Salaborsa Site, entry on Palazzo Felicini

Houses completed in 1497
Felicini
Palazzo Felicini